Lethe gulnihal , the dull forester, is a species of Satyrinae butterfly found in the  Indomalayan realm

Subspecies
L. g. gulnihal Bhutan  to Assam, North Burma
L. g. peguana    (Moore, [1891])    South Burma, Thailand

References

gulnihal
Butterflies of Asia
Butterflies of Indochina